Indigenous peoples in Suriname, Native Surinamese, or Amerindian Surinamese, are Surinamese people who are of indigenous ancestry. They comprise approximately 3.5% of Suriname's population of 612,985.

Contemporary groups

 Akurio, Tapanahoni and Sipaliwini rivers, Kwamalasamutu
 Arawak (Lokono), Suriname, French Guiana, Guyana, Venezuela
 Kalina, Brazil, Guyana, French Guiana, Suriname, Venezuela
 
 Saloema (Taruma), Kwamalasamutu on Sipaliwini river, Brazil, Guyana
 Sikiana, Kwamalasamutu on Sipaliwini river, Brazil
 Tiriyó, Tapanahoni River, Sipaliwini River, Brazil
 Waiwai (Uapixana, Vapidiana, Wapichan, Wapichana, Wapisana, Wapishshiana, Wapisiana, Wapitxana, Wapixana), Amazonas, Brazil, Suriname and Guyana
 Warao (Guarao, Guarauno, Warau, Warrau), Venezuela, Guyana and Suriname
 Wayana, Southwest Marowijne District, upper Tapanahoni river, Brazil, French Guiana

Distribution

See also

 Demographics of Suriname

Notes 

 
Suriname
 
Ethnic groups in Suriname
Indigenous peoples of the Guianas